La Punta, Spanish for "the point" or the promontory and may refer to:

 La Punta, San Luis, Argentina
 La Punta District, Peru
 San Giovanni la Punta, Italy
 San Salvador de la Punta Fortress, Cuba

See also 
 Punta (disambiguation)